The 2019 Thai FA Cup is the 26th season of a Thailand's knockout football competition. It was sponsored by Chang, and known as the Chang FA Cup for sponsorship purposes. The tournament is organized by the Football Association of Thailand. 100 clubs were accepted into the tournament, and it began with the qualification round on 27 March 2019 and concluded with the final on 2 November 2019. The winner would have qualified for the 2020 AFC Champions League preliminary round 2 and the 2020 Thailand Champions Cup. Chiangrai United defend champion but was knocked out in quarter-final by Port.

Calendar

Results
Note: T1: Clubs from Thai League 1; T2: Clubs from Thai League 2; T3: Clubs from Thai League 3; T4: Clubs from Thai League 4; T5: Clubs from Thailand Amateur League.

Qualification round
There were 15 clubs from 2019 Thai League 2, 12 clubs from 2019 Thai League 3, 17 clubs from 2019 Thai League 4, and 28 clubs from 2019 Thailand Amateur League have signed to qualifying in 2019 Thai FA cup. This round had drawn on 14 March 2019.

First round
The first round would be featured by 36 clubs which were the winners of the qualification round and the new entries including 16 clubs from 2019 Thai League 1, 1 club from 2019 Thai League 2, 2 clubs from 2019 Thai League 3, 4 clubs from 2019 Thai League 4, and 5 clubs from 2019 Thailand Amateur League. This round had drawn on 19 April 2019.

Second round
The second round would be featured by 32 clubs which were the winners of the first round including 12 clubs from T1, 12 clubs from T2, 2 clubs from T3, 5 clubs from T4, and 1 club from T5. This round had drawn on 30 May 2019.

Third round
The third round would be featured by 16 clubs which were the winners of the second round including 9 clubs from T1, 4 clubs from T2, 1 club from T3, and 2 clubs from T4. This round had drawn on 21 June 2019.

Quarter-finals
The quarter-finals round would be featured by 8 clubs which were the winners of the third round including 7 clubs from T1 and 1 club from T2. This round had drawn on 19 July 2019.

Semi-finals
The semi-finals round would be featured by 4 clubs which were the winners of the quarter-finals round, all were clubs from T1. This round had drawn on 20 August 2019.

Final

The final round would be featured by 2 clubs which were the winners of the semi-finals round, both were clubs from T1. This round was played on 2 November 2019 at Leo Stadium in Thanyaburi, Pathum Thani.

Top goalscorers

References

External links
Official Facebook page

2019 in Thai football cups
Thailand FA Cup
Thai FA Cup seasons